Calluga psaphara is a moth in the  family Geometridae. It is found on Buru.

References

Moths described in 1929
Eupitheciini
Moths of Asia